Melbourne tram route 109 is operated by Yarra Trams on the Melbourne tram network from Box Hill to Port Melbourne. The 19.3 kilometre route is operated out of Kew depot with A and C class trams.

History
The origins of route 109 lie in separate tram lines, a cable tram from Spencer Street to the Yarra River, a horse tram from the Yarra River to Kew Cemetery, an electric line from Kew Junction to Box Hill (extended over the years), as well as the Port Melbourne railway line.

A cable line was opened by the Melbourne Tramway & Omnibus Company from Spencer Street to Brunswick Street along Collins Street, MacArthur Street, Gisborne Street and Victoria Parade on 2 October 1886, and extended to the west side of the Yarra River along Victoria Parade and Victoria Street on 22 November 1886. A connecting horse tram was built from the east side of the Yarra River to Kew Cemetery, along Barkers Road, High Street South and High Street, opening on 28 December 1887.

The Prahran & Malvern Tramways Trust (PMTT) opened a line from High Street to Burke Road along Cotham Road on 30 May 1913. On 1 November 1914 the PMTT received permission to convert the horse tram line to electric traction, and the new electric line was opened on 24 February 1915. The PMTT extended the Cotham Road line to Union Road, Mont Albert along Whitehorse Road, on 30 September 1916.

In 1929 the Melbourne & Metropolitan Tramways Board (MMTB) started converting the Collins Street cable lines to electric traction, with the last cable tram running down Collins Street on 14 September 1929, and the first electric tram on 8 December 1929. At the same time the MMTB built a new electric line down the centre of Victoria Parade to replace the cable line, which opened on 15 September 1929. For the next six decades the Melbourne to Mont Albert tram was numbered 42, celebrated by a 1982 theatrical production, Storming Mont Albert by Tram, which was performed on a specially-chartered Route 42 tram from the Mont Albert terminus to the city and return.

The line was extended south-west to Port Melbourne along Spencer Street and the former Port Melbourne railway line on 21 December 1987 following the conversion of the railway (along with the St Kilda line) to light rail. The broad gauge  track was re-gauged to standard gauge  and the overhead voltage was reduced from 1500 V DC to 600 V DC with light rail platforms built adjacent to or near the former stations platforms. Initially services operated as route 111 between Carlton Gardens and Port Melbourne. On 19 December 1993, routes 42 and 111 were combined as route 109. When Station Pier was refurbished in 1999, tram tracks were laid to allow for route 109 to be extended onto the pier, but have never been connected.

The line was extended from its original terminus at Mont Albert to Box Hill along Whitehorse Road for 2.2 kilometres on 2 June 2003. In January 2016, route 109 began operating through the night on Fridays and Saturdays as part of the Night Network.

Route

Route 109 runs from Box Hill, travelling west on Whitehorse Road through the suburbs of Mont Albert, Surrey Hills, Balwyn and Deepdene. Entering Kew at Burke Road, Whitehorse Road becomes Cotham Road. It continues west, through Kew Junction and then south west along High Street, High Street South and turns west into Barkers Road.

It crosses the Yarra River into Victoria Street, Richmond and continues west, at Hoddle Street Victoria Street becomes Victoria Parade, it passes through St Vincent's Plaza, passing St Vincent's Hospital, the Royal Victorian Eye and Ear Hospital and turns south onto Gisborne Street, continues south west along MacArthur Street and turns west into Collins Street, entering the CBD, passing Melbourne Town Hall and City Square.

It turns south into Spencer Street, passing Southern Cross station, then crosses the Yarra River and enters Southbank on Clarendon Street before traversing the suburbs of South Melbourne and Port Melbourne on a right-of-way using the former Port Melbourne railway line and terminates at Port Melbourne railway station near Station Pier.

Operation
Route 109 is operated out of Kew depot with A and C1 class trams. For a period from 2002, some services were also operated by Southbank depot.

Route map

Bus route
When cruise ships are berthed at Station Pier, Transit Systems Victoria operate a parallel bus service as route 109 between Station Pier and the Arts Centre.

References

External links

109
109
1993 establishments in Australia
Transport in the City of Whitehorse
Transport in the City of Boroondara
Transport in the City of Yarra
Transport in the City of Port Phillip
Collins Street, Melbourne